Ropica elongatula is a species of beetle in the family Cerambycidae. It was described by Breuning in 1939. It is known from Australia.

References

elongatula
Beetles described in 1939